The Zhonghe–Xinlu or Orange line (code O) is a metro line in Taipei operated by the Taipei Metro, named after the districts it connects: Zhonghe, Xinzhuang and Luzhou.

It was then connected to the Tamsui Line. Due to heavy traffic for residents in the districts of Luzhou and Sanchong travelling in and out of central Taipei, a metro line was planned to meet this urgent need. The line would eventually consist of two branches which connects to Guting via central Taipei. The extension fully opened in 2012.

The entire line, with the exception of the maintenance depot, is underground.

History 

In June 1992, the construction of the Zhonghe Line began. It was the most difficult to construct among all lines of the Taipei metro. The tunnels running through Zhonghe-Yonghe area had to pass under narrow streets, skyscrapers and crowded blocks, with limited spaces for stations above ground. As a result, the whole neighborhood traffic had its so-called "Dark Ages" when the cut-and-cover method was used for station platforms, concourses and crossovers during the 1990s. Besides the river-crossing section, the work suffered from biogas below the waterfront. After the construction, Zhonghe Line became more costly than all the other lines, NT$6.249 billion per kilometer.

Since the line opened for service on 24 December 1998, it has been the most important access to downtown Taipei for nearly half a million of commuters who live in the district.

At the time, Taipei Rapid Transit Corporation Vice Bureau Chief Chang Pei-yi noted that there was a possibility of opening the line for service while skipping both Dongmen and Guting stations, thus allowing for through service on the Orange Line. However, this did not occur. The section opened for service on 30 September 2012 along with Dongmen Station.

It opened for service on 5 January 2012. On its first full day of service, the line served 82,000 passengers. The line is expected to serve 100,000 passengers daily.

As of April 2016, the Xinzhuang Depot was still under construction and expected to be finished in January 2018, completing the Xinzhuang Line.

Although the line was called the Luzhou Branch Line during construction, the name was changed to simply the Luzhou Line before it opened for service.
 2002: The Luzhou and Xinzhuang lines begin construction as part of Phase II of the Taipei Metro.
 September 2007: Track laying begins for the Luzhou Line.
 25 September 2008: Since track laying has been completed for the Luzhou Line, tracks are laid for the segment of the Xinzhuang Line within Taipei.
 1 April 2009: Train testing begins for the Luzhou Line and the segment of the Xinzhuang Line within Taipei.
 22 August 2009: It is announced that although the line was to come into operation before the Spring Festival of 2010, due to malfunctions in the Neihu Line, service for the line would be pushed back to September 2010.
 24 April 2009: The Department of Rapid Transit Systems (DORTS) denies saying that the line would open before the Spring Festival in 2010. The Executive Yuan sets the line to begin service by 31 December 2010. DORTS says it will push forward with an anticipated September 2010 opening date.
 2 March 2010: DORTS says that the line is planned to open by 1 September 2010 in order to coincide with the Flora Expo and will use the Taoyuan Airport MRT's power as backup, so that by November 2010 the Xinzhuang Line can begin train testing through .
 30 June 2010: Construction completes on all stations.
 July 2010: Train testing begins.
 September 4–5, 2010: The Luzhou Line and Xinzhuang Line Taipei City portion to Zhongxiao Xinsheng undergoes initial public testing.
 3 November 2010: The line opens for service with the opening of the Luzhou to Zhongxiao Xinsheng section. A free trial period for the line ran until 2 December 2010.
 3 December 2010: The Luzhou to Zhongxiao Xinsheng began revenue service.
 5 January 2012: The Xinzhuang Line New Taipei City from Fu Jen University to Daqiaotou Station opened for a free trial period for a month.
 5 February 2012: The Fu Jen University to Daqiaotou section began revenue service.
 29 September 2012: Last day of the Beitou–Nanshijiao route upon opening of Dongmen station.
 30 September 2012: The Guting–Zhongxiao Xinsheng section opened for a free trial period for a month connecting the Zhonghe Line to the Xinlu Line. Zhonghe Line passengers traveling to Tamsui Line had to change trains at Guting and would also get a 30% discount for a month.
 30 October 2012: The Guting–Zhongxiao Xinsheng section began revenue service.
 29 June 2013: The Xinzhuang Line was extended from Fu Jen University Station to Huilong Station. A free trial period for the Fu Jen University–Huilong began for a month.
 29 July 2013: The extension to Huilong began revenue service.

Impact 
Since its first three weeks after opening, the line (along with the Xinzhuang Line section) had reached a total ridership of over 3 million passengers, with an average of 157,000 passengers per day. It is expected to cut travel time between Luzhou and Taipei by at least half, with travel time between Luzhou and Taipei Main Station cut down to 17 minutes. The system surpassed an annual ridership of 500 million for the first time on 29 December 2010, widely attributed to the opening of the new line. The line has been effective in relieving congestion, with a 24% increase in average vehicle speed crossing Taipei Bridge (to Taipei) during rush hour since the opening of the line. During the initial one-month trial, bus routes that ran parallel to the metro route experienced a 40% decrease in ridership, although bus ridership is expected to rise again after the end of the free trial.

In anticipation of the opening of the new line, property prices along the route have risen by 36% since 2008. Although small businesses along the line (most notably in Zhongshan and Datong, two older districts) have benefited from increased business during the free trial period, analysts noted that the initial business boon may only be short-lived and it may be years before these areas see real benefits as a result of the new line.

Services 
As of December 2017, the typical off-peak service is:

Stations 
 Operation Services
 X - Xinzhuang Line (Bound for Huilong via Xinzhuang)
 L - Luzhou Line (Bound for Luzhou)

Notes

References 

Taipei Metro
Transportation in New Taipei
Railway lines opened in 1998
1998 establishments in Taiwan